Peter McGrath  is an Australian former professional rugby league footballer who played in the 1970s and 1980s.  McGrath played for Canberra in the NSWRL competition.  McGrath was a foundation player for Canberra playing in the club's first ever game.

Background
McGrath was born in Canberra, Australian Capital Territory and played with the Queanbeyan Blues in the country rugby league competition before signing with Canberra.

Playing career
In 1982, McGrath joined newly admitted Canberra and played in the club's first ever game, a 37–7 loss against South Sydney at Redfern Oval.  McGrath is credited with scoring the club's first points.  Canberra would only go on to win 4 games in 1982 and finished last on the table claiming the wooden spoon.  As of 2019, this is the only time that Canberra has finished last.

Post playing
McGrath went on to become the chairman of ACT Brumbies and also the chairman of the Australian Rugby Union.  McGrath currently works as a lawyer in Canberra.

In 2022, McGrath was appointed as a Member of the Order of Australia (AM) in the 2022 Australia Day Honours for "significant service to rugby union as an administrator, and to tertiary education".

References

Canberra Raiders players
Australian rugby league players
Rugby league five-eighths
Rugby league centres
Rugby league fullbacks
Living people
Members of the Order of Australia
1955 births